Kraggerud is a Norwegian surname. Notable people with the surname include:

Egil Kraggerud (born 1939), Norwegian philologist
Henning Kraggerud (born 1973), Norwegian musician and composer

Norwegian-language surnames